The foreign relations of Syrian Opposition refers to the external relations of the self-proclaimed oppositional Syrian Arab Republic, which sees itself as the genuine Syria. The region of control of Syrian opposition affiliated groups is not well defined. The Turkish government recognizes Syrian opposition as the genuine Syrian Arab Republic and hosts several of its institutions on its territory. The seat of Syria in the Arab League is reserved for the Syrian opposition since 2015.

Diplomatic relations of opposition groups
The Syrian Opposition Coalition (SOC) was formed in Doha in November 2012, and declared itself the legitimate representative of the Syrian people, calling on states to recognize it. It was recognized by the six member States (Saudi Arabia, Bahrain, the United Arab Emirates, Oman, Qatar and Kuwait) of the Gulf Cooperation Council (GCC) within a day. The Arab League "urged regional and international organisations to recognise it [SOC] as a legitimate representative for the aspirations of the Syrian people”, and called it “a legitimate representative and a primary negotiator with the Arab League", but did not recognise it as the sole representative of the Syrian people. France was the first Western country to give recognition to the SOC on 13 November 2012, followed by Turkey on 15 November. On 19 November, Italy and the European Union's Foreign Ministers stated recognition of the SOC as a (rather than the sole) legitimate representative of the Syrian people. Over the following weeks, Britain recognised it as the sole representative, and Germany, Denmark, Norway, the Benelux countries and the US recognised it as "the" legitimate representative. Similar wording was used by the 114 member Friends of Syria group of states in December 2012.

Foreign relations of the Syrian Opposition

Relations with UN member states
The US along with many European allies recognised the Syrian coalition as the legitimate representative of the Syrian people in late 2012.
  - Six Arab Gulf nations recognised the Syrian National Coalition as Syria’s only legitimate representative on 12 November 2012, but Iraq, Algeria and Lebanon prevented the Arab League from following suit. 
  - The Turkish government recognizes Syrian opposition as the genuine Syrian Arab Republic and hosts several of its institutions on its territory, including the Syrian National Council and the high command of the Free Syrian Army.
  - France was the first Western country to give official recognition to the Syrian National Council in November 2012.
  - In December 2012, US president Barack Obama announced the US would formally recognise the Syrian Opposition Coalition, rather than the Damascus government, as the legitimate representative of the Syrian people. , the embassy of the United States is suspended due to the Syrian civil war. The Syrian National Coalition’s offices in the United States were recognised as diplomatic missions in May 2014.

Relations with international organisations
  - The GCC recognized the Syrian National Coalition  as the legitimate representative of the Syrian people in November 2012, the first formal international endorsement it received.
  - On 6 March 2013, the Arab League granted to the Syrian National Coalition Syria's seat in the Arab League. Moaz al-Khatib, president of the National Coalition for Syrian Revolutionary and Opposition Forces formally took its vacant seat at an Arab League summit meeting that month. On 9 March 2014, the pan-Arab group's secretary general Nabil al-Arabi said that Syria's seat at the Arab League would remain vacant until the opposition completes the formation of its institutions. 
  In November 2012 the EU recognised the SNC as the "legitimate representative" of the Syrian people.

See also
 Foreign relations of Syria
 Foreign relations of Rojava

References

Foreign relations of the Syrian Opposition